Genesee Scientific Corporation, a life science products company, is a leading supplier of products to global life science research markets. With thousands of products available, its markets include pharmaceutical and biotechnology companies, medical research institutions, research and development laboratories, universities, colleges and secondary education institutions, hospitals, reference labs, and quality control/process control laboratories.

History 
1995 - Genesee Scientific founded by Ken Fry.
2003 - Acquired United Scientific Plastics (USP), a California Bay Area distributor of laboratory plasticware.
2007 - Acquired Island Scientific, a Seattle area distributor of laboratory plasticware.
2007 - Established East Coast warehouse and offices located in Research Triangle Park, NC.
2009 - Acquired Continental Lab Products (CLP) brands.
2011 - Notable expansion of Olympus Plastics product line of tissue culture supplies.
2013 - Became an authorized Eppendorf distribution partner, a Germany-based manufacturer of instruments and consumables.
2016 - Notable introduction of Prometheus product line, proprietary products for protein biology research.
2017 - Launched GenClone product line, a full line of cell culture media products centered around ultra-pure, high-performance fetal bovine sera.

Innovations 
The company has innovated the UPrep column used in deoxyribonucleic acid (DNA) purification. The idea behind the UPrep column, is that most, if not all, nucleic acid purification or clean-up kits come equipped with 10-15% more reagent volume than is actually needed for the number of columns the kit contains. This means that for a kit with 100 columns, you end up with enough reagent for another 10 to 15 preps after you run out of columns. Normally, this excess reagent is tossed out. UPrep columns allow you to use this extra reagent for additional preps.

Genesee Scientific has also been responsible for developing Blue Devil autoradiography film which produces exceptional clarity and sharpness with extremely low backgrounds. Blue Devil Film is used for blotting, sequencing, chemiluminescent autoradiography (ecl) and gel shift analysis. It is designed for use with 14C, 35S, 32P, and 125I.

Drosophila Research 
Genesee Scientific is the world leader in innovation for and supply to the Drosophila (fruit fly) research community. Drosophila are widely used as a model organism in the field of genetics.

Genesee Scientific has been awarded three patents by the United States Patent and Trademark Office for its revolutionary Drosophila vial racking system (patent numbers D673,296 S; 8,136,679 B2; and 8,430,251 B2). This Drosophila vial racking system significantly decreases time spent racking vials and is more environmentally friendly compared to traditional vial packaging configurations.

Genesee Scientific has also developed the first atlas of Drosophila phenotypic markers available on mobile devices. Genesee the Drosophila App is a free tool providing researchers with a quick reference to various Drosophila phenotypes and is a valuable teaching tool for new Drosophila researchers.

Registered trademarks 
Genesee Scientific (Reg. #: 3934361)
Flystuff, Drosophila research supplies and equipment (Reg. #: 5617401)
Flugs, Cellulose acetate closures for vials (Reg. #: 3153821)
INVICTUS, Incubators (Reg. #: 5617401)
INVICTUS NEXT-GEN, Incubators (Reg. #: 5867956)
Nutri-fly, Media for Drosophila research (Reg. #: 5626165)
Droso-Plugs, Foam closures for vials (Reg. #: 5773033)
SUPERBULK, Bulk supplies offering less packaging and smaller footprint (Reg. #: 5867964)
GenClone, High-performance cell culture media products (Reg. #: 5322208 )
Gene Choice, Competent cells for cloning (Reg. #: 4217346)
NEXT-GEN, Latex and nitrile exam gloves (Reg. #: 3439167)
UPrep, Spin columns for DNA and RNA purification (Reg. #: 3153821)
Prometheus, Proprietary protein biology research products (Reg. #: 5322104)
SECadex, Size exclusion chromatography media (Reg. #: 5322241)
ProSignal, Electrophoresis, blotting, and detection reagents; X-ray film (Reg. #: 5322254))

Brands 
Apex provides a variety of chemicals & reagents to the life science industry.
Blue Devil provides film is used for autoradiography, Western blotting, sequencing, chemiluminescence and gel shift analysis.
Flystuff provides products and services specifically for the Drosophila research community.
Gene Choice provides competent cells for cloning applications.
GenClone provides cell culture media, sera (FBS), buffers, and reagents for cell and tissue culture.
Nutri-fly provides nutrient balanced media formulations specifically for Drosophila melanogaster.
Olympus Plastics provides plasticware for general liquid handling and cell and tissue culture applications.
Poseidon provides ergonomic liquid handling equipment including precision pipettes and pipet controllers.
Prometheus provides protein separation/purification resins and Western blotting reagents and consumables.
TITAN provides powder-free nitrile and latex examination gloves.
UPrep provides spin columns for DNA and RNA (nucleic acid) purification.

Citations 
Following is a list of links to articles published in scientific journals that cite Genesee Scientific:

 
 
 
 
 
 http://www4.ncsu.edu/~jmalonso/Alonso-Stepanova_Plant_DNA_96.html
 http://www.jove.com/video/2641/isolation-of-drosophila-melanogaster-testes
 http://www4.ncsu.edu/~jmalonso/Alonso-Stepanova_Plant_DNA_1.html
 https://web.archive.org/web/20160303225004/http://cda.currentprotocols.com/WileyCDA/CPUnit/refId-cb0418.html
 
 http://www.jove.com/video/3786/endurance-training-protocol-and-longitudinal-performance-assays-for-drosophila-melanogaster
 http://www.jove.com/video/2541/a-simple-way-to-measure-ethanol-sensitivity-in-flies

Notes 

Companies based in San Diego
Companies established in 1995
Research support companies
Privately held companies based in California
Life sciences industry
1995 establishments in California